Juan Antonio Dinarés Quera (born 23 September 1969 in Terrassa, Catalonia) is a former field hockey midfielder from Spain, who won the silver medal with the men's national team at the 1996 Summer Olympics in Atlanta, Georgia.

References
 Spanish Olympic Committee

External links
 

1969 births
Living people
Spanish male field hockey players
Male field hockey midfielders
Field hockey players from Catalonia
Sportspeople from Terrassa
Olympic field hockey players of Spain
Field hockey players at the 1992 Summer Olympics
Field hockey players at the 1996 Summer Olympics
1998 Men's Hockey World Cup players
Field hockey players at the 2000 Summer Olympics
Olympic silver medalists for Spain
Olympic medalists in field hockey
Medalists at the 1996 Summer Olympics
Club Egara players
1990 Men's Hockey World Cup players